Serjeant may refer to:

The holder of a serjeanty, a type of feudal land-holding in England
A generally obsolete spelling of sergeant, although still used in some British Army regiments, notably The Rifles
Serjeant-at-arms, an officer appointed to keep order during meetings
Serjeant-at-law, an obsolete class of barrister in England and Ireland
Craig Serjeant (born 1951), Australian former cricketer
Serjeant (horse), a British Thoroughbred

See also
Marcus Sarjeant (born 1964), person who fired six blank shots at Queen Elizabeth II in 1981
Sergeant (disambiguation)